The 2018 Savannah State Tigers football team represented Savannah State University in the 2018 NCAA Division I FCS football season. The Tigers were members of the Mid-Eastern Athletic Conference (MEAC). They were led by third-year head coach Erik Raeburn and played their home games at Ted Wright Stadium. They finished the season 2–8, 1–6 in MEAC play to finish in last place.

This season marked the Tigers' final season playing in Division I as they rejoined Division II after the season.

On December 9, head coach Erik Raeburn was fired. He finished as Savannah State with a three-year record of 8–23.

Previous season
The Tigers finished the 2017 season 3–8, 3–5 in MEAC play to finish in seventh place.

Preseason

MEAC preseason poll
In a vote of the MEAC head coaches and sports information directors, the Tigers were picked to finish in eighth place.

Preseason All-MEAC Teams
The Tigers had five players selected to the preseason all-MEAC teams.

Offense

3rd team

Paris Baker – TE

Defense

1st team

Stefen Banks – DL

3rd team

Brandon Carswell – DL

Special teams

2nd team

Giovanni Lugo – K

3rd team

JaMichael Baldwin – RS

Personnel

Coaching staff
Shawn Quinn - Defensive Coordinator/Linebacker Coach

Schedule

Despite also being a member of the MEAC, the game vs Howard will be considered a non-conference game and will have no effect on the MEAC standings.

Game summaries

at UAB

at Miami (FL)

at Florida A&M

Bethune–Cookman

Charleston Southern

Morgan State

Norfolk State

at Delaware State

North Carolina A&T

at South Carolina State

References

Savannah State
Savannah State Tigers football seasons
Savannah State Tigers football